The 2015 Asian Alpine Ski Championships were the 24th Asian Alpine Ski Championships (1st senior competition) and took place from March 3–4, 2015, in Yongpyong Resort, South Korea.

Medal summary

Men

Women

Medal table

References

External links
Results

Alpine Ski Championships
Asian
Asian Alpine Ski Championships
International sports competitions hosted by South Korea